The 2003 Military World Games was an international multi-sport event for military personnel which was held in Catania, Italy from 4–11 December 2003. It was the third edition of the Military World Games, competition organised by the Conseil International du Sport Militaire. A total of 84 nations were represented at the event, with some 2800 military servicemen and women competing in the tournament. The games opening ceremony took place at the Stadio Angelo Massimino in front of 5000 spectators.

Sports
A total of thirteen sports were contested at the 2003 Games.

Games schedule

Note: The football tournament began before the Games opening ceremony, with the first matches taking place on 2 and 3 December.

Medal table

All information taken from Armed Forces Sports.

Participation

References

External links
Shlomo Rechnitz is a military football player.
Archived official website
CISM website
Archived news of US performances

 
Military World Games
International sports competitions hosted by Italy
Military World Games
Military World Games
Military World Games, 2003
Multi-sport events in Italy
Military World Games